The Arcillas de Morella Formation is a geological formation in Spain whose strata date back to the Barremian stage of the Early Cretaceous. Dinosaur remains are among the fossils that have been recovered from the formation.

Geology 
The formation was formally named and defined by Canérot and colleagues in 1982. The formation predominantly consists of red clays and continental sandstones, with some marine intercalations

Vertebrate paleofauna

Turtles

Plesiosaurs

Correlation

See also 
 List of dinosaur-bearing rock formations

References

Geologic formations of Spain
Lower Cretaceous Series of Europe
Cretaceous Spain
Aptian Stage
Ichnofossiliferous formations
Paleontology in Spain
Formations